Maikel Renfurm (born 8 July 1976 in Paramaribo, Suriname) is a Dutch professional football player. Currently he is assistant manager at Westlandia after retiring from the game in 2011.

He was Dutch Cup finalist in 2000 with N.E.C. and later that year became Icelandic champion with KR.

References

1976 births
Living people
Dutch footballers
Surinamese emigrants to the Netherlands
Eredivisie players
Sparta Rotterdam players
NEC Nijmegen players
Dutch expatriate footballers
Expatriate footballers in Iceland
Knattspyrnufélag Reykjavíkur players
Expatriate footballers in Scotland
Scottish Premier League players
St Mirren F.C. players
Expatriate footballers in Germany
2. Bundesliga players
Rot Weiss Ahlen players
Expatriate men's footballers in Denmark
Herfølge Boldklub players
Sportspeople from Paramaribo
Dutch expatriate sportspeople in Iceland
Haaglandia players
Association football forwards
Voorschoten '97 players